Andreas Mihavecz is an Austrian from Bregenz who holds the record of surviving the longest without any food or liquids. His ordeal is documented in the Guinness World Records.

On 1 April 1979, the then 18-year-old bricklayer's apprentice was mistakenly put into custody in a holding cell for being a passenger in a crashed car and completely forgotten about by the three policemen responsible for him. Each of them thought that the two others had already freed Mihavecz. They also ignored the pleas of his worried mother, who was concerned for what might have happened to her son.

As his cell lay in the basement, nobody could hear his screams. He survived by ingesting condensed water from the walls and eventually lost  of weight. 18 days later on 19 April, an officer who had unrelated business in the basement opened his cell after noticing the stench that was emanating from it. Mihavecz needed several weeks to regain his health.

In the criminal trial that followed, the three policemen accused each other. In the end, they were fined an amount equivalent to 2000 EUR as there was no evidence of criminal neglect or who was the main culprit. Two years later however, a civil court awarded Mihavecz 250,000 Austrian schillings (~19,000 EUR) in compensation.

Mihavecz's case was later included in the first edition of a German book on urban legends, as the updated form of a medieval German folk tale of the forgotten peasant in the debtors' prison.

References 

  (1997), (2007)

Austrian prisoners and detainees
1960s births
Living people
Austrian world record holders
People from Vorarlberg
Hunger
Starvation